{{Infobox song
| name       = Movin' On
| cover      = CCP MO single.jpg
| alt        =
| type       = single
| artist     = CeCe Peniston featuring Suga T.
| album      = I'm Movin' On
| B-side     = Remix
| released   = {{plain list|
  <ref name=release>[https://books.google.com/books?id=xAcEAAAAMBAJ&pg=PA14=true J.R. Reynolds, ''CeCe Peniston's 'Movin' On. Billboard. July 27, 1996]</ref>
 
  
}}
| recorded   =
| studio     =
| venue      =
| genre      = 
| length     =  
| label      = A&M
| writer     = 
| producer   = Dave "Jam" Hall
| prev_title = Hit by Love
| prev_year  = 1994
| next_title = Before I Lay (You Drive Me Crazy)
| next_year  = 1996
| misc       = 

}}

"Movin' On" is a song by American musician CeCe Peniston, released on July 23, 1996, as the lead single from her third studio album, I'm Movin' On (1996). The track is produced by Dave Hall and charted at number twenty-nine on the US Billboard R&B chart. It also reached number 83 on the Billboard Hot 100. A remixed version of the song peaked at number ten on the Billboard Hot Dance Music/Maxi-Singles Sales chart and entered the top 30 in Japan.

Critical reception
Larry Flick from Billboard felt the song "shows her finally fitting comfortably into the R&B sound that she has been cultivating over the past few years. Her booming voice now possesses the darker shades needed to hang tough in circles inhabited by such artists as Faith Evans and Mary J. Blige." Ha also noted that producer Dave "Jam" Hall contributes to Peniston's vocal confidence by placing her in "a sleek, funk-fortified musical context that complements her phrasing style quite well." Peter Miro from Cash Box stated that "Movin' On" "kicks up a danceable groove that touches base with Peniston's solid club foundation, yet her emotive phrasing connects with a deeper soul reservoir this format merely hints at. Targeting new consumers, she's a firm fixture in the R&B camp henceforth. Guest artists G. Man and Suga T. flavor the best of the lot."

Credits and personnel

 CeCe Peniston – lead/back vocal, lyrics, engineer
 Dave Hall – music, producer
 Gordon Chambers – lyrics, vocal arrangement
 Tenina Stevens  – rapping
 Jorge Corante  – rapping, remix, additional producer
 StarrStrukk- {additional producer
 Paul Logus – engineer, mix
 Junior Vasquez – mix, additional producer
 Joe Moskowitz – engineer, programming
 P. Dennis Mitchell – remix engineer
 Manny Lehman – executive producer
 Damon Jones – executive producer
 Daniela Federici – photography
 Greg Ross – design
 DMH Studios, Elmsford, NY – studio
 Sony Music Studios, (New York City) – mix
 WB Music Corporation – admin, publisher
 Ness, Nitty & Capone, Inc. – publisher
 Stone Jam Publishing – publisher
 Blue Zephyr Music/CeCe Pen Music – admin
 PolyGram International/Orisha Music – admin

Track listings and formats

 CS, US, #31458 1656 4 CD, US, #31458 1656 2 "Movin' On" (LP Edit) - 3:25
 "Movin' On" (G.Man with Rap Edit) - 3:59

 MCD, JP, #POCM-1179 MCD, US, #31458 1657 2 "Movin' On" (Original LP Edit) - 3:50
 "Movin' On" (G.Man & Starrstrukk with Rap Edit) - 3:59
 "Movin' On" (Smooth Club Mix Edit With Rap) - 4:13
 "Movin' On" (Hard Club Mix) - 8:00
 "Movin' On" (LP Version) - 3:46

 12", US, #31458 1657 1 "Movin' On" (Hard Club Mix) - 8:00
 "Movin' On" (Smooth Club Mix) - 6:18
 "Movin' On" (Club Dub) - 8:00
 "Movin' On" (Dave Hall Hip Hop Remix) - 4:00
 "Movin' On" (G.Man Slammin' Remix with Rap Male) - 4:23
 "Movin' On" (G.Man Slammin' Remix with Rap) - 4:23
 "Movin' On" (G.Man Slammin' Remix without Rap) - 4:23
 "Movin' On" (LP Version) - 3:46

 MCD, US, Promo, #AMSAD 00254 "Movin' On" (Original LP Edit) - 3:25
 "Movin' On" (Original LP Edit with Rap) - 3:50
 "Movin' On" (Original LP Edit with Long Intro) - 3:28
 "Movin' On" (LP Version) - 3:46
 "Movin' On" (Smooth Club Mix Edit) - 4:13
 "Movin' On" (G.Man with Rap Male Edit) - 3:59
 "Movin' On" (G.Man with Rap Edit Feat. Suga T.) - 3:59
 "Movin' On" (G-Man Mix without Rap Edit) 3:50

 12", US, Double, Promo, #AMPRO 00256'''
 "Movin' On" (Hard Club Mix) - 8:00
 "Movin' On" (Club Dub) - 8:00
 "Movin' On" (Smooth Club Mix) - 6:18
 "Movin' On" (Dave Hall Hip Hop Remix) - 4:00
 "Movin' On" (G.Man Slammin' Remix with Rap Male) - 4:23
 "Movin' On" (G.Man Slammin' Remix with Rap) - 4:23
 "Movin' On" (G.Man Slammin' Remix without Rap) - 4:23
 "Movin' On" (Rub-a-Dub-Dub) - 7:58
 "Movin' On" (Major Dub) - 9:21
 "Movin' On" (Tribal Dub) - 8:00
 "Movin' On" (Dave Hall Hip Hop Remix Instrumental) - 4:00
 "Movin' On" (G.Man Slammin' Remix Instrumental) - 4:23
 "Movin' On" (LP Version) - 3:46
 "Movin' On" (Accapella) - 3:47

Charts

References

General

 Specific

External links 
 

1996 singles
CeCe Peniston songs
Songs written by Gordon Chambers
Songs written by Dave Hall (record producer)
Songs written by CeCe Peniston
1996 songs
A&M Records singles
Song recordings produced by Dave Hall (record producer)